Four in the Morning is a Canadian television comedy-drama series, which premiered on CBC Television on August 26, 2016. Starring Lola Tash, Michelle Mylett, Daniel Maslany and Mazin Elsadig, the series focuses on four friends in their 20s who regularly get together at 4 a.m.

The series was produced by Serendipity Point Films, on a low budget model of $300,000 per episode. The series was not renewed for a second season.

Development

Creator and show-runner Ira Parker wrote the pilot script, which was meant to feel like a play, when he was in graduate school .  He had a season mapped out in his mind, and loosely based some of the characters and storylines on his own experiences. Parker was surprised that CBC picked up the show with its sex scenes, drug use and profanity, and that the public broadcaster allowed them to make the show without creative limitations.

Parker wrote all the episodes, then spent a week with playwright Daniel Goldfarb refining the scripts for the season.

Cast
Lola Tash as Mitzi
Michelle Mylett as Jamie
Daniel Maslany as Bondurant Smit
Mazin Elsadig as William Wilson

Production

The series was produced by Serendipity Point Films, on a low budget model of $300,000 per episode. It was set and filmed in Toronto, including the Patrician Grill on King Street East and Massey Hall.

The majority of filming was done overnight, between 6 p.m. and 6 a.m.  Maslany said this helped develop a surrealist mindset.

Episodes

Themes

The series considers in-between times when anything can happen. Journalist Bill Harris wrote that 4 a.m. marked the behavioural dividing line between "people heading to work rather than staggering home".
He noted that the plot is suited to this transitional time, when the characters are both "tired and wired."
David Berry of the National Post noted that experiences at this hour are more definitive for being beyond daily routines.
Journalist Melita Kuburas wrote that the show is about the moments when the effects of alcohol wear off which "reveal tender, sweet and sad aspects of young adulthood."
Actor Maslany felt the characters are escaping the frustrations of their daily lives and seeking the unexpected.  He noted that social codes don't seem to apply in a time when most people are asleep.

Creator Ira Parker called it a "genre-bending show", more drama than comedy, with elements of fantasy, science fiction, and twists of the absurd which Parker calls "magical realism". 
Harris described it as "a televised stage play [...] more artsy than raw."
Kuburas noted that the characters are "unreliable narrators" of the story that includes moments of magical realism.
Maslany stated that these elements show how "anything feels possible" at that hour.

Jealousy is a major theme, talked about in the first episode and left to build through the season.  This is exacerbated by a lie told to Mitzi by the ghost of her pet pig, and shakes-up the group.

References

External links

2016 Canadian television series debuts
2016 Canadian television series endings
2010s Canadian comedy-drama television series
CBC Television original programming